Gang War is an American film released in 1940. It features an African American cast and was directed by Leo C. Popkin. It was produced by Million Dollar Productions. The film is about the rivalry between two gangs.

In 1998, the Turner Classic Movies (TCM) television channel screened the film as part of a month-long showing of race films.

Cast
Ralph Cooper as Bob "Killer" Meade
Gladys Snyder as Mazie "Sugar" Walford
Reggie Fenderson as Danny
Lawrence Criner as Lew Baron
Monte Hawley as Bill
Jesse Brooks
Johnny Thomas
Maceo Sheffield (Maceo Bruce Sheffield)
Charles Hawkins
Robert Johnson
Henry Roberts
Harold Garrison

References

1940 films
Films directed by Leo C. Popkin
African-American films
American gang films
1940s American films